Khusef (also Romanized as Khūsef and Khūsf; also known as Husp) is a village in Sabzdasht Rural District, in the Central District of Bafq County, Yazd Province, Iran. At the 2006 census, its population was 77, in 30 families.

References 

Populated places in Bafq County